Luis Enrique Molina (born San Miguel de Tucumán, 3 November 1959) is a former Argentine rugby union player. He played as a prop.

He first played for Tucumán Lawn Tennis Club, where he won four titles of the Argentine First Division, from 1978 to 1982. He later would play for Los Tarcos Rugby Club.

Molina had 12 caps for Argentina, from 1985 to 1991, without ever scoring. He won three times the South American Rugby Championship in 1985, 1987 and 1989. He was called for the 1987 Rugby World Cup, playing in all the three games but without scoring. He was called once again for the 1991 Rugby World Cup, playing in one game, without scoring, as Argentina would be eliminated in the 1st round.

References

External links
Luis Molina International Statistics

1959 births
Living people
Argentine rugby union players
Argentina international rugby union players
Rugby union props
Sportspeople from San Miguel de Tucumán